Michael C. Hyter is President and CEO of The Executive Leadership Council (ELC), a membership organization committed to increasing the number of global Black executives in C-suites, on corporate boards and in global enterprises. The ELC is composed of more than 800 current and former Black CEOs, senior executives and board directors at Fortune 1000 and Global 500 companies, and entrepreneurs at top-tier firms. 

In March 2021, Hyter was appointed by The ELC’s Board of Directors, succeeding the interim President and CEO, Crystal Ashby. Hyter leads the organization’s efforts to open channels of opportunity for Black executives to positively impact business and communities and to nurture and amplify Black excellence and leadership in business.

Early life 
Hyter was raised as the oldest of five children in Detroit, Michigan by Leroy and Betty Hyter. He received a Bachelor of Arts degree in Human Resource Management from Michigan State University.

Career 
Hyter has more than 25 years of entrepreneurial and business experience working closely with Fortune 1000 executives and boards to help their organizations thrive; leading and advising complex, global companies and c-level executives on human resources matters across a variety of industries.

He began his career at the Dayton Hudson Corporation and by 1992, he became vice president of community, government affairs, and public relations for sixty-three Dayton’s, Hudson’s, and Marshall Field’s stores.

Hyter attended a leadership development program organized by J. Howard & Associates where he was exposed to efficacy principles that accelerated his career and led him to join the firm by 1996. Three years later, he was promoted to a managing director role and in 2001 was named President and CEO.

Mr. Hyter went on to become president and Chief Operating Officer of Novations Group Inc., a global talent development firm and the parent company of J. Howard & Associates, before leading the company as President and CEO by 2006. He later served as the president and Managing Partner of Global Novations LLC, a provider of diversity, inclusion and leadership development solutions, where he was responsible for the global operations of the $40 million business with 250 staff while also overseeing mergers & acquisitions, performance management, budgeting, and competitor analysis.

He later sold Global Novations LLC to Korn Ferry, a global organizational consulting firm, who officially acquired it in 2012, before joining the firm and leading the Korn Ferry’s Washington, D.C. office as Managing Partner. As Managing Partner, Hyter oversaw the firm’s $60 million operation and led 120 staff members. After nine years as Managing Partner, he served as Chief Diversity Officer, playing a key role in building Korn Ferry's Diversity and Inclusion (D&I) practice.

Hyter has been recognized as one of Savoy Magazine’s Most Influential Blacks in Corporate America in 2016 and 2018. In 2021, Savoy Magazine listed Hyter as one of the Most Influential Black Corporate Directors.

Hyter serves on the board of directors of Dine Brands Global Inc. (NYSE:DIN), sitting on the Nominating and Governance Committee and is also a member of The Economic Club of Washington, DC and Sigma Pi Phi fraternity.

In June 2021, Hyter and ELC announced a three-year, $6 million initiative titled "Build, Grow, Protect" to create Black wealth in America. The initiative was inspired by Black Wall Street and done in partnership with fin-tech platform Goalsetter. Hyter stated, “The ELC is proud to embark on this mission with Goalsetter to ensure that Black Americans never again have to wait for financial liberation and will instead have the opportunities and resources they need to thrive, succeed and begin building generational wealth, as a community and for their community.

Personal life 
Hyter is married to his wife Tisha Hyter, Senior Vice President at PNC Financial Services .

Publications 
A successful author, Hyter’s most recent publication is The Power of Choice: Embracing Efficacy to Drive Your Career (2011). He is also co-author of The Power of Inclusion: Unlock the Potential and Productivity of Your Workforce, published by Wiley in 2005.

In 2019, Hyter co-authored a study focused on Black corporate leadership, called “The Black P&L Leader,” a study that exposed an overwhelming lack of diversity in senior corporate roles, including just four Black CEOs leading Fortune 500 companies in the U.S.

He has published extensive articles in publications including the Miami Herald, Handbook of Business Strategy, Director’s Monthly, Profiles in Diversity Journal, and Inc.

References 

Living people
African-American business executives
Year of birth missing (living people)
Michigan State University alumni